SS Northerner was the first paddle steamer lost in operations by the Pacific Mail Steamship Company.

History

Northerner was built in 1847 by William H. Brown, of New York City, as a companion to the SS Southerner for the Spofford & Tileston Company's line of steamers serving Charleston, South Carolina and the East Coast of the United States.  In 1850, Northerner was sold to a Mr. Howard and sent to the Pacific under Captain Waterman.  Subsequently purchased by the Pacific Mail Steamship Company she was initially placed in service between San Francisco and Panama.

In January, 1851, Northerner arrived from San Francisco with $2,600,000 in gold dust and treasure on board, and carrying 500 passengers. In August, 1851 Northerner broke the shaft of her starboard wheel soon after leaving Panama. She completed the voyage to San Francisco using only one paddle wheel, in 22 days, arriving September 8, 1851, with 20 tons of freight and 350 passengers, including mutineers from the passenger ship Commodore Stockton  who had to be clapped in irons for disorderly conduct by the captain.

After 1853, the Northerner was placed on a more northerly route, carrying mails and passengers between San Francisco and Oregon as far as the Columbia River and the gold fields at Fraser River, arriving for the first time on September 3, 1858.

On October 10, 1858, southbound from Olympia to San Francisco, Northerner was hit broadside by the Steam Tug Resolute in Dana's Straits.  Since thousands of dollars of damage was done to both vessels, and it was a clear night in a mile-wide passage, the ship owners filed cross-suits in the Washington Territorial Courts.  The owners of the Resolute were unsatisfied with the Washington's court decision, and filed their case in the U.S. Supreme Court.

Northerner sailed for the last time from San Francisco with 108 persons on board at the time of the wreck, 58 passengers and 53 crew.  The ship hit a submerged rock and wrecked January 6, 1860 on Centerville Beach, California, a few miles south of the entrance to Humboldt Bay. Thirty-eight people died: 17 were passengers and 21 crew. One of those who died was Francis Blomfield, son of the late Bishop of London, Charles James Blomfield.  Seventy others made their way through crashing surf to shore and were aided by local people including Seth Kinman and Arnold Berding. 
  
The Centerville Beach Cross marks the resting place of some of the victims whose bodies were recovered.

In December 1863, the U.S. Supreme Court (68 U.S. 682), ruled Northerner was at fault for steering across the path of the Resolute.

References

Further reading

Merchant ships of the United States
Steamships of the United States
Paddle steamers of the United States
Ships built in New York City
Shipwrecks of the California coast
Maritime incidents in January 1860
History of Humboldt County, California
1847 ships